Horror Vacui is the sixth studio album from the Italian nu metal band, Linea 77. It was released on February 8, 2008.

It is the first work produced by Universal and in which Linea 77 collaborated with the producer Toby Wright. The title of the album is linked to cenophobia and the theme of the emptiness of life.

Track listing
"The Sharp Sound of Blades" - 3:48
"Sempre meglio" - 3:16
"Grotesque" - 3:03
"Il mostro" - 4:24
"Sogni risplendono" (feat. Tiziano Ferro) - 3:38
"My Magic Skeleton" - 3:43
"Penelope" - 3:57
"Mi vida" - 3:49
"Overload" - 4:10
"La nuova musica italiana" - 4:54
"Touch 2.0" - 2:48
"Kings" (iTunes Bonus Track) - 3:54
"Pete" (DeeJay Store Bonus Track) - 3:46

Charts

References

2008 albums
Linea 77 albums
Albums produced by Toby Wright
Universal Music Italy albums
Italian-language albums